Federico Enrique Sztyrle (born 9 September 1964) is an Argentine equestrian. He competed in two events at the 2004 Summer Olympics.

References

External links
 

1964 births
Living people
Argentine male equestrians
Olympic equestrians of Argentina
Equestrians at the 2004 Summer Olympics
People from San Martín, Buenos Aires
Sportspeople from Buenos Aires Province